La Copa Aerosur 2009 is the seventh edition of the summer soccer tournament sponsored by Aerosur. Involved six teams of core cities in Bolivia: Bolivar and The Strongest of La Paz, Cochabamba Aurora and Wilstermann, Blooming and Oriente Petrolero of Santa Cruz. The tournament began on January 18, 2009 and culminate on February 4 of that year.

The 2009 version of the cup had three novelties: [1] defined by shootout in case of ties in all instances of the tournament, the implementation of a tournament U-18 parallel to the official tournament, and a recoil to be played between the champion Aerosur Cup, the champion of the Copa Aerosur del Sur and two foreign expos.

Cup champion will have free passage on Aerosur to travel to play their games during the 2009 season of the Bolivian Professional Football League, while the runner will have a 75% discount. The other participants may access the 50% discount on tickets if they agree to bring the airline's logo on his uniform.

In this Edition the teams (Copa Simon Bolivar 2008) with the best average qualified to the first round of this edition.

Teams that qualified to group stage

Qualifying round

|}

Group stage

Group A
In this group Nacional Potosi qualified anyway as the copa simon bolivar 2008 winners

Group B

Group C

Group D

Semi-final
 In this Round Oriente Petrolero Qualified as the best loser

|}

First leg

Second leg

Final

|}

First leg

Second leg

Copa Aerosur del Sur
Teams that were 2nd  qualified to this tournament.

Semi-final

|}

Final

|}

References
 Bolivar Campeon de la copa aerosur 2009 (in Spanish)

2009 domestic association football cups
2009
2009 in Bolivian football